Daggers Springs is an unincorporated community in Botetourt County, Virginia, United States.

An 1855 gazetteer noted that it was a "post-village" where "extensive buildings have been erected for the entertainment of the public."

References

Unincorporated communities in Botetourt County, Virginia
Unincorporated communities in Virginia